Jabbor Rasulovich Rasulov (July 10, 1913 – April 4, 1982) was First Secretary of the Communist Party of Tajikistan between April 12, 1961 and April 4, 1982.

Life
Born on July 10, 1913 in the city of Khujand, Samarqand Region (now Tajikistan) to a working-class family. In 1934, he graduated from the Central Asian Cotton Institute. From 1934 to 1938, he worked as a cotton farmer at an agricultural station.

He was the head of Department, Deputy People's Commissar of Agriculture of the Tajik SSR from 1938 to 1941. Later, he served as the Commissioner of Agriculture of People's Commissariat for the USSR on Tajik SSR. In 1946, he was appointed as Tajik SSR Minister of Industrial Crops and later as Soviet Ambassador to Togo (1960-1961).

He died in 1982 and was buried in Dushanbe.

Awards 
 Hero of Socialist Labour
 9 Orders of Lenin
 Order of the October Revolution
 Order of the Patriotic War
 3 Orders of the Red Banner

References 

1913 births
1982 deaths
Soviet diplomats
First Secretaries of the Communist Party of Tajikistan
Heroes of Socialist Labour
Recipients of the Order of Lenin
Second convocation members of the Supreme Soviet of the Soviet Union
Third convocation members of the Supreme Soviet of the Soviet Union
Fourth convocation members of the Supreme Soviet of the Soviet Union
Fifth convocation members of the Supreme Soviet of the Soviet Union
Sixth convocation members of the Supreme Soviet of the Soviet Union
Seventh convocation members of the Supreme Soviet of the Soviet Union
Eighth convocation members of the Supreme Soviet of the Soviet Union
Ninth convocation members of the Supreme Soviet of the Soviet Union
Tenth convocation members of the Supreme Soviet of the Soviet Union
Ambassadors of the Soviet Union to Togo
People from Khujand
People from Samarkand Oblast
Heads of government of the Tajik Soviet Socialist Republic